Zangi may refer to:
 Zangi, East Azerbaijan
 Zangi, Kermanshah